The qualifying rounds for the 1992 US Open were played in late August 1992 at the USTA National Tennis Center in Flushing Meadows, New York City, United States.

Seeds

Qualifiers

Lucky loser
  Kyōko Nagatsuka

Draw

First qualifier

Second qualifier

Third qualifier

Fourth qualifier

Fifth qualifier

Sixth qualifier

Seventh qualifier

Eighth qualifier

References
 Official results archive (WTA)
1992 US Open – Women's draws and results at the International Tennis Federation

Women's Singles Qualifying
US Open (tennis) by year – Qualifying